The Holden Commodore (VS) is an executive car which was produced by Holden from 1995 to 1997 and 2000 for utility versions. It was the fourth and final iteration of the second generation of the Commodore. The range included the luxury variants, Holden Berlina (VS) and Holden Calais (VS).

Overview 
Launched in April 1995, the VS Commodore served as a mechanical update of the second generation architecture, destined to assist sales before the all-new VT model in August 1997. The extent of exterior changes veered not much further than a redesigned Holden logo and wheel trims. An updated Ecotec (Emissions and Consumption Optimisation through TEChnology) version of the Buick V6 engine coincided with the changes to the engine in the United States. Holden mated the new engine with a modified version of the GM 4L60-E automatic transmission, bringing improved throttle response and smoother changes between gears. Safety features were also improved, with a passenger airbag becoming available.

The utility version of the VS was released in April 1995. The limited edition VS wagon with manual gearbox had a production run of just 300 vehicles.

The VS Commodore was the last of which to be sold as Toyota Lexcens, as Holden and Toyota ended their model-sharing scheme. The last Lexcens were built during 1997.

Series II
In June 1996 the Series II of the VS was launched, featuring the new ECOTEC (Emissions and Consumption Optimisation TEChnology) 3800 V6, which compared to the previous 3800 V6, more powerful, more economic, produces less emissions, quieter and smoother. It was also fitted with a passenger-side airbag, the first Australian built car to offer this feature. Other changes included elliptical side turn signals, interior tweaks and the introduction of a L67 Supercharged V6 engine for selected trim levels.

From 1 January 1997 Holden's new car warranty for the VS Series II and subsequent models increased to 3 years / 100,000 km. Production of the Series II continued until August 1997, when the sedan and wagon were replaced by the new Commodore VT.

Series III
As the new VT did not feature a utility variant among its model range, the VS Series II Ute remained in production after the VS sedan and wagon were replaced by the new models. In June 1998 an upgraded version of the Utility, the Series III, was released, which was unique in the Commodore's history as it was limited to just a single variant. The new model Ute was identified by Series III badges and clear side blinker repeater lights, and featured a number of interior upgrades.

The biggest change came in the way of the engine, as the Series II's 165kW V8 was replaced by the new 179kW version from the VT, which featured sequential fuel injection. Along with these changes saw the introduction of the SS V8, the first time this model option was available in a Commodore utility.  Externally, the SS was identified by an integrated body kit comprising a new front bumper and side skirts, polished alloy rear sports bar, 16-inch alloy wheels, fog lamps and SS decals. The interior featured a leather wrapped sports steering wheel, hand brake and gearshift knob, and the seats had SS identification. Power windows and air-conditioning was standard, as were the Getrag 5-speed manual transmission, limited-slip differential, sports suspension and ABS brakes.

The Series III Ute remained in production until the December 2000 release of the new Holden Ute (VU).

Exports
Between 1995 and 1997 the VS was also sold in small numbers to Malaysia and Singapore as the Opel Calais. Prior to the VS, the Opel-badged models were sold in VR specification from 1994. As of December 1994, Holden were selling approximately 40 per month of the VR series Opel Calais. Both the VR and VS versions were fitted with the Opel-sourced 2.6-litre C26NE inline-six engine and four-speed 4L30-E automatic. These vehicles initially featured the front-end of the VR Statesman until a circa 1997 facelift progressed to the front-end design of the VS Caprice. The final batch of Singapore-bound Opel Calais models were produced in August 1997 and featured the newer 2.5-litre X25XE V6 engine with the 4L30-E automatic transmission. However, this order was cancelled, likely due to the imminent Asian financial crisis. As the vehicles were not compliant for sale in Australia, they were instead exported to New Zealand and retailed through Ebbett Waikato dealerships, complied as 1998 models, and rebranded as the Holden Commodore Royale.

HSV range 

Holden's performance vehicle partner Holden Special Vehicles produced the following range of Holden VS based models, which were each marketed under the HSV brand.

Clubsport 
The VS Clubsport was very similar to the VR Clubsport and still used the 5.0-litre V8 from the VR Clubsport.

Manta 
The Manta was introduced in April 1995 in sedan and wagon models.

GTS and GTS-R 
The GTS sedan was the flagship model until the limited edition GTS-R was launched. The latter was exclusively painted in XU-3 Yellah with matching seat colour inserts, and it featured a big race-style rear carbon-fibre wing. In total, only 75 were built for Australia and 10 for New Zealand, all using the 215i 5.7-litre HSV V8 engine, with a more powerful "blueprint" option also available.

Maloo 
The facelifted VS series Maloo utility was released in April 1995. 173 examples were produced. It featured a 5.0-litre V8 engine still producing .

The Series II version was introduced in June 1996 and carried through in its original form to August 1997, during which time 280 examples were produced. With HSV's introduction of the VT sedan range in September 1997, continued production of the VS Maloo thereafter was curiously referred to as VS II at VT Maloo, whereby a further 388 examples were produced through to December 1998. These later models included a special run of ten HSV 10th Anniversary Edition Maloo utes featuring an exclusive Anniversary Bronze paint colour.

The next HSV update of the VS Maloo followed Holden's release of a VS Series III ute that, for the first time, included a V8 SS version. In 1999, HSV introduced an improved VS III Maloo with a wiring upgrade to support the revised  V8 that had been introduced two years earlier with the original VT series HSV sedans. The VS III Maloo's legacy is to be the last HSV vehicle to be fitted with the 'original' Holden V8 engine.

Senator 
In 1995 the VS Senator was introduced based on the VS Commodore. This model saw slight revisions to the body styling, trim and new alloy wheels. The VS Series II saw the fitment of HSV's ISS (Integrated Security System) as standard as well as new steering-wheel mounted stereo controls. There remained a choice of two models: the 185i and the 215i. The 185i had the 5.0-litre (4987 cc) V8 engine which pushed out 185 kW (248 hp) at 4800 rpm. The 215i had the 5.7-litre (5737 cc) V8 engine which delivered 215 kW (288 hp) at 4800 rpm. The total number that were built by December 1995 was 416, down 439 units over the VR.

Toyota Lexcen (T4 and T5) 
The United Australian Automobile Industries (UAAI) joint venture agreement with Toyota Australia first starting with the VN Commodore continued up to the VS. The VS Lexcen equivalent was known as the T4 series, updated in 1996 to T5 following Commodore’s Series II update. The Lexcen featured subtle styling differences, particularly, the front panels. The Lexcen was discontinued in August 1997 and Toyota would not enter the Australian market with another large family car under their own brand. Instead, the Lexus GS S160 was offered which had similar dimensions to the Lexcen and was available with both V6 and V8 engines.

References 

VS
Cars introduced in 1995
2000s cars 
Cars of Australia
Full-size vehicles
Rear-wheel-drive vehicles
Sedans
Station wagons